Rohaniella pygmaea, the pigmy emperor, is a moth of the family Saturniidae. It is found in Africa, including Namibia and South Africa. The species was first described by Peter Maassen and Gustav Weymer in 1885.

The larvae feed on Burkea africana. The larvae are consumed and are considered a delicacy.

References

External links 
"Rohaniella pygmaea (Maassen, 1885)". African Moths.

Saturniinae
Moths of Africa
Moths described in 1885